Under One Roof was an English-language sitcom in Singapore. First aired in 1995, it was the first locally produced sitcom in Singapore. A critical and popular success, the show won the Best Comedy Programme or Series Award at the Asian Television Awards in both 1996 and 1997, a Best comedy actor award (Moses Lim in 1996), three best comedy actress awards (Koh Chieng Mun in 1996, Norleena Salim in 1997 and Vernetta Lopez in 1999) and was a finalist in the "Best Sitcom" category at the International Emmy Awards as well as the New York Festivals Awards. It paved the way for future Singaporean local sitcoms like Phua Chu Kang Pte Ltd.

It starred a multicultural cast reflecting the ethnic makeup of Singapore: Moses Lim (Tan Ah Teck), Koh Chieng Mun (Dolly), Vernetta Lopez (Denise), Nicholas Lee (Ronnie), Andrew Lim (Paul), Norleena Salim (Rosnah), Zaibo (Yusof), Daisy Irani (Daisy) and Rajiv Dhawn (Michael).

Cast
Under One Roof stars a multiracial cast of characters. The plot tells the story of a Chinese family, living in Bishan North, Singapore, headed by Tan Ah Teck-the owner of a mini-mart and his family-housewife Dolly and children Denise, Ronnie and Paul along with their neighbours, namely the married Malay couple Rosnah and Yusof, and Daisy, a lady of Indian descent along with her brother, Michael all living together in an apartment building.

Moses Lim as Tan Ah Teck, the patriarch of the Tan family and a mini-mart owner. He is prompted by any situations that occur to tell his unappreciated and seemingly irrelevant stories with the intent of teaching the other characters some moral lessons. Frequently begins his stories with "This reminds me of a story! Long before your time, in the Southern province of China..."
Koh Chieng Mun as Dolly, a stoic peacemaker and faithful housewife of Ah Teck, she is one of the few characters who are willing to sit through and even appreciate his stories.  She is best friends with neighbour Rosnah.
Vernetta Lopez as Denise, the University-educated daughter of Ah Teck and Dolly, and the only sensible one in the family who tries to keep the household sane.
Nicholas Lee as Ronnie, a son of Ah Teck and Dolly. He is frequently skirt-chasing and is full of schemes and ridiculous ideas which irk his family, especially Paul, Denise and father Ah Teck.
Andrew Lim as Paul, a son of Ah Teck and Dolly, and a hypochondriac accountant who enjoys classical music.
Norleena Salim as Rosnah, Yusof's large and sharp-tongued wife who often dominates her husband. In the first episode of Season 6, it was mentioned that she had passed away from over eating that choked her to death in a buffet.
Zaibo as Yusof, a Mee rebus seller, Rosnah's husband and friend of the Tan family.
Daisy Irani as Daisy, a single advertising executive. She is excitable, outspoken and constantly bickers with her brother Michael.

Release 
Under One Roof has been exported to Australia, Malaysia, Philippines, Taiwan, France and Canada. It was the first Singaporean series to be aired in Canada, and Australia on SBS.

Under One Roof was brought back shortly during Channel 5's 40th anniversary in 2003 for its 7th season, only to run for a short 
period.
The sitcom then rebroadcast in May 2011 and aired on weekdays around 12pm before being dubbed into French.

In September 2011, 30 episodes season 1 was dubbed into French and aired in other countries worldwide. It became Singapore's first ever English sitcom to be dubbed into a foreign language. Some episodes of Seasons 1 and 2 have been dubbed into French and aired in some other countries in 2011, becoming Singapore's first ever English-language sitcom to be dubbed into a foreign language. Season 3 was then dubbed into French in early 2012.

Singlish 

Due to its use of Singlish, a pidgin English spoken in Singapore, the show came under pressure by the Singaporean government to use only "proper" English. This was mainly because of the worry that the younger school going viewers would start speaking Singlish more and  bring down the standard of spoken English in Singapore. Another popular show that also received similar pressure was Phua Chu Kang Pte Ltd where the lead character Phua Chu Kang was criticised for speaking Singlish.

References

External links 

Under One Roof Season 7 Website
Under One Roof,for one last time Article

1994 Singaporean television series debuts
2003 Singaporean television series endings
Singaporean television sitcoms
Singaporean comedy television series
Channel 5 (Singapore) original programming